The QBZ-03 (Mandarin: Qīngwuqi Bùqiāng Zìdòng—"light rifle automatic") assault rifle, also known as the Type 03, is a Chinese gas operated, selective-fire assault rifle designed and developed for the 5.8×42mm DBP87 round.

Unlike the bullpup QBZ-95, the QBZ-03 is a weapon of conventional design. The weapon is designed to be easily used by soldiers already familiar with previously issued assault rifles and machine guns.

Design
The QBZ-03 has a two-piece receiver largely made up of forged aluminum alloy with the stock, pistol grip, and handguards being made of a polymer compound. Its design appears to be based on the cancelled Type 87 assault rifle, chambered in 5.8mm. The rifle was made in conjunction with the QBZ-95 as an alternative primary weapon.

The gas block has a two position regulator, one for firing standard ammunition, the other to allow the use of rifle grenades. The sights are of a hooded front sight with a flip up rear diopter sight similar to the American M16 rifle. A scope rail is available to allow the use of various optics.

The weapon has a faster rate of fire compare to QBZ-95. Operating system is similar to Type 81 assault rifle featuring rotating bolt locking and short-stroke gas piston.

An export variant of the QBZ-03 also exists, first introduced in 2005 by the joint CJAIE (China Jing-An Import-Export) and Jiang-She Group Companies. The export version is chambered in 5.56×45mm NATO and feeds by STANAG magazines. The cyclic rate on the issued model is semi-automatic or fully automatic only, while the export model has an integrated three round burst mode. The type's most notable public display was by the PLA Airforce Airborne Troops during the October 1st 2009 60th Anniversary Parade. The assault rifle was also featured in the 2015 Victory Day Parade.

Upgrades

Picatinny rail
A new tactical variant of the weapon was spotted at a counter-terrorism exhibition; the tactical variant is equipped with quad-rail hand guard and is used by police and border guards.

QTS-11 OICW

In February 2011, photos began to appear of a Chinese weapon called the QTS-11. The QTS-11 combines the Type 03 assault rifle with a 20 mm airburst grenade launcher.  This makes China the third country to develop an airburst infantry weapon, after the American XM29 Objective Individual Combat Weapon and XM25 CDTE, and the South Korean K11 DAW.

Variants
QBZ-03: Base model.
QBZ-03 Upgrade: Upgraded tactical variant, first unveiled at a 2014 anti-terrorism exhibition, with upgrades including a quad-rail handguard.
T03: Export variant chambering 5.56x45 mm NATO and takes STANAG magazines.
T03A: Improved variant.
EM3513: Semi-automatic export variant, chambering 5.56 mm.
EM3513A: Improved variant, with rails and new stock.

Users

Non-state actors
  United Wa State Army

References

External links 
 

5.56 mm assault rifles
5.8 mm firearms
Assault rifles of the People's Republic of China
Norinco
Short stroke piston firearms
Weapons and ammunition introduced in 2003